The 1982–83 season saw Rochdale compete in their 9th consecutive season in the Football League Fourth Division.

Statistics
																								
																								

|}

Final League Table

Competitions

Football League Fourth Division

F.A. Cup

League Cup (Milk Cup)

Lancashire Cup

References

Rochdale A.F.C. seasons
Rochdale